Ekaterina II ( Catherine II of Russia) was the lead ship of the  ironclad battleships built for the Imperial Russian Navy in the 1880s. Her crew was considered unreliable when the crew of the pre-dreadnought battleship  mutinied in June 1905 and her engines were decoupled from the propellers to prevent them from joining Potemkin. She was turned over to the Sevastopol port authorities before being stricken on 14 August 1907. She was re-designated as Stricken Vessel Nr. 3 on 22 April 1912 before being sunk as a torpedo target for the Black Sea Fleet.

Design and description 

Ekaterina II had two 3-cylinder vertical compound steam engines built by the Baltic Works. Fourteen cylindrical boilers, also built by the Baltic Works, provided steam to the engines.

Ekaterina II differed from her sisters mainly in her  gun mounts. Her guns used bulky, hydraulically powered Moncrieff disappearing gun mounts. They had a rate of fire of five minutes, ten seconds between aimed rounds. Each of the forward mounts could traverse 30° across the bow and 35° abaft the beam, or a total of 155°. Sixty rounds per gun were carried. The main guns were mounted very low, (only ) above the main deck, and caused extensive damage to the deck when fired over the bow or stern. The seven  Obukhov Model 1877 35-calibre guns were mounted on broadside pivot mounts in hull embrasures, except for one gun mounted in the stern in the hull. Six of the eight  five-barrelled revolving Hotchkiss guns were mounted in small sponsons that projected from the hull with the aftermost pair mounted in embrasures in the hull to defend the ship against torpedo boats. Four  five-barrelled revolving Hotchkiss guns were mounted in the fighting top. She carried seven above-water  torpedo tubes, one tube forward on each side, able to bear on forward targets, two other tubes mounted on each broadside forward and aft of the central citadel and the seventh tube was in the stern.

History 
Ekaterina II was named after the Empress Catherine II of Russia. She was the only one of her class to be built by the Nikolayev Admiralty Dockyard at Nikolaev. The ship was laid down on 26 June 1883, launched on 20 May 1886, and completed in 1889. She ran her first trials in 1888, after she had been transferred to Sevastopol to be fitted out, and spent her career with the Black Sea Fleet. In 1897 the Naval General Staff proposed to re-gun her with more powerful 12-inch 40-calibre guns and to replace the compound armour of her redoubt with Krupp armor, but this proved to be too expensive. Her machinery was upgraded between mid-1898 and 1902. Her boilers were replaced with eighteen Belleville water-tube boilers and her engines were converted to triple expansion.

Her crew was considered sympathetic to the revolutionary movement when the crew of the battleship  mutinied in June 1905 and her engines were disabled to prevent her from joining Potemkin. She was turned over to the Sevastopol port authorities before being stricken on 14 August 1907. She was re-designated as Stricken Vessel Nr. 3 on 22 April 1912 before being sunk as a torpedo target. The remnants of the ship were salvaged in 1914 in Nikolaev.

Notes

References

Bibliography

External links 

 Brief article plus photogallery 
 Specifications 

Ekaterina II Class
1886 ships
Battleships of Russia
Disappearing guns
Ships built at Shipyard named after 61 Communards